The M. P. Birla Group is an Indian industrial group named after Madhav Prasad Birla. It has business interests in cement, cables, jute goods and guar gum. Birla Corporation (estb. 1919) is the flagship company of the group. Other companies of the group include Universal Cables Ltd., Vindhya Telelinks Ltd., Birla Cables Ltd., Birla Furukawa Fibre Optics Pvt Ltd and Hindustan Gum & Chemicals Ltd.

Operations 
It has its registered office in Kolkata and regional offices in Mumbai and New Delhi, among other places. In addition to Kolkata, Birlapur and Durgapur, the group has plants located in Rewa, Maihar, Satna, Raebareli City, Kundanganj (Raebareli), Chanderia (Chittorgarh), Jodhpur, Viramgam, Bhiwani, Butibori and Goa.

Businesses
 Birla Corporation Limited is a cement major and its eight brands are marketed under the umbrella identity of M P Birla Cement.
 Universal Cables Limited is in the cables industry, and its cables and capacitors are known by the brand name "Unistar".
 Vindhya Telelinks Limited manufactures jelly-filled telephone cables in technical collaboration with M/s. Ericsson Cables AB of Sweden.
 Birla Cables Limited produces optical fibre cables and polyurethane jelly-filled insulated cables.
 Birla Furukawa Fibre Optics Private Limited manufactures optical fibre.
 Hindustan Gum & Chemicals Limited: manufactures guar gum and exports to various countries around the world. The company has three manufacturing units in India.

Philanthropy
The M.P. Birla Group also runs several institutions, including the M.P. Birla Planetarium, Belle Vue Clinic, Priyamvada Birla Aravind Eye Hospital, South Point School and the M.P. Birla Foundation Higher Secondary School in Kolkata as well as medical institutions like Bombay Hospital in Mumbai, with units at Indore and Siddhi; Birlapur Hospital in Birlapur, West Bengal; M.P. Birla Hospital and Research Centre in Chittorgarh (Raj.); and M P Birla Hospital & the Priyamvada Birla Cancer Research Centre in Satna.

Education
 South Point School and South Point High School, Kolkata
 M.P.Birla Foundation Higher Secondary School Kolkata
 Birlapur Vidyalaya, Birlapur, West Bengal
 M.P. Birla Shiksha Bhawan, Allahabad
 Birla Shiksha Kendra, Chanderia, Chittorgarh
 Priyamvada Birla HS School, Satna
 MP Birla Industrial Training Institute, Rewa
 M.P. Birla Institute of Management, Bangalore
 Bhavan's Priyamvada Birla Institute of Management, Mysore
MP Birla Planetarium, Kolkata
MP Birla Institute of Fundamental Research , Bangalore, Bengaluru

Hospitals
 Bombay Hospital- Mumbai
 Bombay Hospital- Indore
 Bombay Hospital- Siddhi
 Belle Vue Clinic-Kolkata
 Priyamvda Birla Aravind Eye Hospital-Kolkata
 Priyamvda Birla Aravind Eye Hospital-Durgapur
 M.P.Birla Eye Clinic-Kolkata
 Birlapur Hospital - Birlapur, West Bengal
 M.P Birla Hospital - Satna, M.P.
 Priyamvada Birla Cancer Research Institute, Satna, M.P. 
 M.P Birla Hospital and Research Centre - Chittorgarh

Sponsorship
In September 2017, it was announced that M.P Birla Cement had paid ₹2 Crore (₹20 million) and become a co-sponsor of the popular football club Mohun Bagan A.C.

External links
 Birla Corporation

Companies based in Kolkata
Conglomerate companies of India
Indian companies established in 1919
Conglomerate companies established in 1919